Top Model, season 3 (or Top Model: Milano) was the third and final season of Top Model. The winner of the competition was 18-year-old Freja Kjellberg Borchies from Vaxholm. The runners-up were Anna Brændstrup from Aarhus and Therese Haugsnes from Flateby. Following the conclusion of the season, the three countries parted ways and went on to produce their own individual adaptations of Top Model.

Call-out order

  The contestant was eliminated
 The contestant won the competition

Denmark's pre-selection
 Denmark's competition was hosted by Anne Pedersen, who was also the head judge until the three countries merged and Cynthia Garrett took over. The first episode was aired in Denmark on 14 February 2006, with the finale being aired on 2 May. The first episode saw nine contestants selected for the competition. The final three girls chosen to compete in the final competition with Norway and Sweden were Anna Brændstrup, Camilla Schønberg and Sara Olsen. The last contestant standing was Brændstrup, who was runner-up overall.

Contestants
(ages stated are at start of contest)

Final 10

Final 3

Judges
Anne Pedersen (host)
Hervé Bernard (photographer)
Mariana Verkerk (guest judge)

Norway's pre-selection
Norway's competition was hosted by Kathrine Sørland, who was also the head judge until the three countries merged and Cynthia Garrett took over. The first episode was aired in Norway on 27 February 2006, with the finale being aired on 15 May. The first episode saw nine contestants selected for the competition. The final three girls chosen to compete in the final competition with Denmark and Sweden were Cathrine Wenger, Mira Aanes Wolden and Therese Haugsnes. The last contestant standing was Haugsnes, who was runner-up overall.

Contestants
(ages stated are at start of contest)

Final 9

Final 3

Sweden's pre-selection
 Sweden's competition was hosted by Malin Persson, who was also the head judge until the three countries merged and Cynthia Garrett took over. The first episode was aired in Sweden on 8 March 2006, with the finale being aired on 24 May. The two-hour premiere saw ten contestants selected for the competition. The final three girls chosen to compete in the final competition with Denmark and Norway were Florina Weisz, Freja Kjellberg Borchies and Sabina Karlsson. The last contestant standing was Kjellberg Borchies, who went on to win the competition.

Contestants
(ages stated are at start of contest)

Final 10

Final 3

Photo shoot guide
Photo shoot 1: Fruit swimsuits
Photo shoot 2: Young mothers
Photo shoot 3: Romantic sensuality
Photo shoot 4: Busy streets couture
Photo shoot 5: Underwater nymphs
Photo shoot 6: Gladiatoresses
Photo shoot 7: Bikinis on the Italian Alps
Photo shoot 8: Golden 20s Vamp
Photo shoot 9: Beauty shoot with popsicles 
Photo shoot 10: Diva with man and paparazzi

References

External links 
Official website of Top Model Danmark (archive at the Wayback Machine)
Official website of Top Model Norge (archive at the Wayback Machine)
Official website of Top Model Sverige (archive at the Wayback Machine)

Scandinavia
2006 Danish television seasons
2006 Norwegian television seasons
2006 Swedish television seasons